Mispila (Dryusa) coomani is a species of beetle in the family Cerambycidae. It was described by Stephan von Breuning in 1968. (Dryusa) signifies a subgenus.

References

coomani
Beetles described in 1968